Ma Teng (died June or July 212), courtesy name Shoucheng, was a Chinese military general and warlord who lived during the late Eastern Han dynasty of China. He controlled Liang Province (涼州; covering parts of present-day Shaanxi and Gansu) with another warlord, Han Sui. Ma Teng and Han Sui were involved in efforts to gain autonomy from the Han central government.

Life
Descendant of Ma Yuan, Ma Teng was from Maoling County, Fufeng Commandery (present-day Xingping, Shaanxi). His father, Ma Ping, was a minor official in Tianshui Commandery, but because of some dispute he was dismissed from his post, and went to live among the Qiang people.

Ma Teng grew up in extreme poverty and made a living selling firewood he collected in the mountains. After growing up, his height was said to have been over eight chi, (≈1.86 metres). He was said to have been fierce in appearance, but kind to others, wise, and respected by many.

In 184, during the final years of Emperor Ling's reign, the Qiang people in Liang Province rose up against the local government under Beigong Yu and Liwen Hou. They were joined by members of the local gentry Han Sui and Bian Zhang. The official Han governor of Liang Province, Geng Bi, gathered forces to put down the rebellion, and Ma Teng volunteered as a foot soldier. His skills in battle against the rebels were recognised and he rose through the ranks of the soldiery. However, when Geng Bi was killed in battle by the rebel army, Ma Teng switched sides and joined Han Sui. The rebellion was eventually suppressed by the Han general Huangfu Song but Ma Teng escaped along with the rebels. In the end, the central government granted military titles to some of the rebel leaders in order to appease them.

When Li Jue and Guo Si seized power over Chang'an after Dong Zhuo's assassination, Ma Teng and Han Sui at first pledged allegiance to them, and were appointed as General who Attacks the West and General who Guards the West respectively. However, the relationship between the two sides quickly soured, and Ma Teng and Han Sui led their armies in an attempt to seize Chang'an. They allied themselves with the warlord Liu Yan, but suffered defeats from the hands of Li Jue's forces led by Guo Si, Fan Chou and Li Li. Not only was the loss of 10,000 soldiers a heavy blow to the morale of the allied forces, they also faced a supply shortage at the time, so the eloquent Han Sui asked Fan Chou for a private talk, during which Han Sui successfully persuaded Fan Chou to abort the pursuit because they shared the same hometown. The allied forces then retreated back to Liang Province safely.

Although Ma Teng was initially on good terms with Han Sui, the two went to war against each other over control of Liang Province. The fighting escalated to a point where they were killing each other's wives and children. Cao Cao, who at this point had decisively defeated Yuan Shao at the Battle of Guandu, brokered peace between Ma Teng and Han Sui, who then pledged allegiance to the Han dynasty and sent troops to assist Cao Cao in defeating Yuan Shao's successors and remnants. After this, Ma Teng was summoned to Ye city with most of his family, and was appointed Minister of the Guards. His eldest son, Ma Chao, remained behind in Liang Province with Han Sui.

Around early 211, Ma Chao secretly formed a coalition with Han Sui and other minor warlords in Liang Province and started a rebellion against the Han dynasty. While persuading Han Sui to join him, Ma Chao said, "[...] Now, I abandon my father, and I'm willing to acknowledge you as my father. You should also abandon your son, and treat me like your son." Cao Cao defeated Ma Chao and his coalition at the Battle of Tong Pass in September 211. Sometime in the summer of 212, Emperor Xian issued an imperial decree ordering the execution of Ma Teng and the rest of his family who were with him in Ye city at the time.

In Romance of the Three Kingdoms
In the 14th-century historical novel Romance of the Three Kingdoms, Ma Teng is portrayed as a loyalist of the declining Han dynasty. He participates in a plot with Liu Bei and Dong Cheng to assassinate Cao Cao, who in the novel, is depicted as a villain monopolising power and holding Emperor Xian hostage. However, the plot is unsuccessful and Ma Teng returns to Liang Province.

When Ma Teng is later recalled to the imperial capital Xuchang, he decides to again join a plot to assassinate Cao Cao, this time with Huang Kui. However, the plot is discovered and he is executed along with his sons Ma Xiu and Ma Tie. Upon hearing of his father and brothers' deaths, Ma Chao becomes filled with rage and goes to war with Cao Cao to avenge his family, starting the Battle of Tong Pass.

In popular culture 
Ma Teng is a warlord and playable character in the game Total War: Three Kingdoms. Ma Teng also appears in the Dynasty Warrior games, specifically Dynasty Warriors 5, and Dynasty Warriors 9.

See also
 Lists of people of the Three Kingdoms

References

 Chen, Shou (3rd century). Records of the Three Kingdoms (Sanguozhi).
 
 Fan, Ye (5th century). Book of the Later Han (Houhanshu).
 Luo, Guanzhong (14th century). Romance of the Three Kingdoms (Sanguo Yanyi).
 Pei, Songzhi (5th century). Annotations to Records of the Three Kingdoms (Sanguozhi zhu).
 Sima, Guang (1084). Zizhi Tongjian.

Year of birth unknown
212 deaths
3rd-century executions
Executed Han dynasty people
Executed people from Gansu
Han dynasty generals from Gansu
Han dynasty warlords

People executed by the Han dynasty